Escouade 99 is a Canadian French language adaptation of Brooklyn Nine-Nine, produced in Quebec for streaming service Club Illico. It debuted on September 17, 2020.

Directed by Patrick Huard, it stars Mickaël Gouin, Bianca Gervais, Mylène Mackay, Widemir Normil, Léane Labrèche-Dor, Fayolle Jean Jr. and Guy Jodoin, and transposes the setting to Quebec City.

The series entered production on a second season in March 2021. The series was also broadcast on TVA beginning April 6, 2021.

Criticism
After the preview trailer premiered on the internet in August 2020, actress Melissa Fumero, who plays Amy Santiago in the original Brooklyn Nine-Nine, criticized the program for casting its versions of Amy Santiago and Rosa Diaz with Caucasian rather than Latina actresses. According to Fumero, "while I understand the Latina population is [very] small in Quebec (& how many of them are funny actors?) the Amy and Rosa roles could’ve gone to ANY BIPOC so it’s disappointing to see that missed opportunity." Talhi Briones, a Chilean Canadian writer and illustrator, also criticized the apparent whitewashing of Latina characters, as well as expressing concern about whether the series would retain Rosa Diaz's bisexuality.

Writing for Le Devoir, Justine Robidas also expressed concern about the show's cast, praising it for casting Haitian Canadian actors Widemir Normil and Fayolle Jean Jr. as its versions of Captain Holt and Terry Jeffords, but noting the absence of any significant characters representing Quebec's large Maghrebian, Asian or indigenous communities. She also asserted that the show was less an adaptation of Brooklyn Nine-Nine than a direct copy that missed much of what made the original show successful; other sources have also commented that numerous scenes in the trailer seemed to be shot-for-shot copies of scenes in the original series.

Conversely, Hugo Dumas of La Presse acknowledged the diversity issue, but wrote that in casting Black actors to portray the two main African American characters from the original, the show was already doing significantly better at representing cultural and racial diversity than most television series produced in Quebec. Normil has also confirmed that his character, Captain Raymond Célestin, retains Captain Holt's status as a gay man.

Writing for the Montreal Gazette, T'Cha Dunlevy covered the criticism by highlighting the stories of three Latina actresses working in Quebec (Ariane Castellanos, Sabrina Bégin-Tejeda and Ligia Borges), and their difficulties in getting cast for major non-Latina specific roles in Quebec film and television productions.

References

Television shows filmed in Quebec
2020s Canadian sitcoms
2020 Canadian television series debuts
2020s Canadian LGBT-related comedy television series
Canadian television series based on American television series
Television shows set in Quebec City
Brooklyn Nine-Nine
Club Illico original programming